Harold Gene James (February 15, 1925 – July 6, 1997) was an American professional basketball player. He played for the New York Knicks and Baltimore Bullets between 1948 and 1951 while averaging 3.4 points per game for his career.

BAA/NBA career statistics

Regular season

Playoffs

References

External links

1925 births
1997 deaths
American men's basketball players
Baltimore Bullets (1944–1954) players
Basketball players from Ohio
Basketball players from West Virginia
Forwards (basketball)
Marshall Thundering Herd men's basketball players
New York Knicks players
People from Ironton, Ohio
Sportspeople from Charleston, West Virginia
Undrafted National Basketball Association players